Telford is a locality in Victoria on the Oaklands railway line, Victoria.

Transport 
It is served by a wheat silo.  The branchline is now freight only and no longer carries passenger trains.

See also 
 Oaklands railway line, Victoria

References 

Towns in Victoria (Australia)
Shire of Moira